Lutz Schülbe (born 9 November 1961) is a German former footballer.

Career statistics

Notes

References

External links

1961 births
Living people
German footballers
East German footballers
Dynamo Dresden players
Hallescher FC players
DDR-Oberliga players
Association football forwards